Angie Morrill (born 1965 in Portland, Oregon) is a member of the Klamath tribes in Oregon. She is a former Native admissions recruitment officer for the University of Oregon. She is currently the Program Director of Title VI Indian Education for Portland Public Schools.

Early life and education 
Angie Morrill was born in 1965 in Portland, Oregon. Her mother is Peggy Jo Ball who is Modoc and Klamath. She grew up in North Portland and attended Jefferson High School. In 2005, Morrill earned her B.A in Ethnic Studies from the University of Oregon. In 2016, she earned her Ph. D from University of California San Diego in Ethnic Studies with a focus on Native feminist methodologies.  Her dissertation, Towards A Native Feminist Reading Practice, uses family and tribal sources to explore the importance of Native feminist thought in Native studies.  Morrill was also awarded a Chancellor's Postdoctoral Fellowship in Native American Studies at University of Davis California.

Work in academia 
Morrill is considered a Native feminist and her work examines history, memory, haunting and violence through a Native feminist lens. She focuses on Native feminist methodologies which frame Native Feminist Theory (Indigenous Feminism).

In 2013, Morrill collaborated with Maile Arvin and Eve Tuck on their article "Decolonizing Feminism: Challenging Connections Between Settler Colonialism and Heteropatriarchy" which was published by Johns Hopkins University Press. This article focuses on ways to challenge the connections between settler colonialism and heteropatriarchy from a Native feminist theory perspective.

In 2016, Morrill collaborated once more with Eve Tuck and the Super Futures Haunt Collective on their article, "Before Dispossession, or Surviving It" which was published in Liminalities: A Journal of Performance Studies. This article focuses on "Indigenous theorizations of settler colonialism, Black theorizations of antiblackness. and theorizations of visitations and fugitivity..."

Again in 2016, Morrill was published by Sage Publications for her individual work, "Time Traveling Dogs (and Other Native Feminist Ways to Defy Dislocations)" This article focuses on the analysis of a Native feminist painting and it's "rememory map of dislocations and hauntings and disappearances."

Her dissertation, Toward a Native Feminist Reading Methodology was published in 2016 from University of San Diego. In her dissertation, she "introduces the Native feminist reading practice, a methodology that resists disappearance and affirms presence." She analyzes different pieces of Native art and media with the methodology through self recognition which that itself, Morrill affirms is an act of survivance. Through creating this methodology, she uses self recognition and survivance as a means to examine the "differences between settler and indigenous readings." Morrill explains further, "I hope this methodology can be named and used for theorizing and understanding Native feminist narratives."

Other work and mentions 
In May 2014, Morrill participated in an academic conference called "Alternative Sovereignties: Decolonization Through Indigenous Vision and Struggle" held at the University of Oregon. She participated as speaker on a concurrent panel called "Gender, Jurisdiction, and Justice."

In February 2018 the article "Decolonizing Feminism: Challenging Connections Between Settler Colonialism and Heteropatriarchy" was mentioned in the International Feminist Journal of Politics in an article "Decolonizing Knowledges in Feminist World Politics" by Anne Sisson Runyan.

Her work as part of the activist art collective Super Futures Haunt Qollective (a.k.a. SFHQ) -- as her alter ego Lady HOW -- has been seen at The Alice Gallery in Seattle  and Museum of Art and History, Santa Cruz.

References

Living people
1965 births
Date of birth missing (living people)
Activists from Portland, Oregon
University of Oregon alumni
University of California, San Diego alumni
Native American feminists